Maurice "Mo" Edmund Baringer (December 4, 1921 – May 25, 2011) was an American educator and politician.

Biography 
Maurice "Mo" Edmund Baringer was born December 4, 1921, in Arkansas City, Kansas.  He was the middle child of the five children born to George William Baringer and Ada Maude Shilling Baringer. He graduated from Arkansas City High School and continued his education at the University of Kansas, from which he received his bachelor's degree in business in 1943. He served in the United States Army Air Forces during World War II and was stationed in the Pacific. He served as an anti-aircraft artillery officer.  He then earned his bachelor's and master's degree in animal husbandry from Iowa State University in 1947–1949. Baringer worked in the commercial feed business in management, nutrition, and sales. Baringer taught animal husbandry at Iowa State University. He lived in Oelwein, Iowa. Baringer served in the Iowa House of Representatives from 1961 to 1969. He served as speaker of the house from 1967 to 1969 and was a Republican. In 1967, the Statehouse Press Corps presented him a citation as outstanding Representative. From 1969 to 1982, Baringer served as Treasurer of Iowa. He raised horses and cattle at his farm in Woodburn, Iowa after his retirement.

Baringer met his wife, Dorothy Mae Schlensig, while attending Iowa State University and they married in 1948. He and his wife had four children: two sons and two daughters. Baringer died suddenly on May 25, 2011, at Mercy Hospital in Des Moines, Iowa.

Notes

External links

https://www.legis.iowa.gov/legislators/legislator?ga=59&personID=611

1921 births
2011 deaths
People from Arkansas City, Kansas
People from Clarke County, Iowa
People from Oelwein, Iowa
Farmers from Iowa
Military personnel from Kansas
United States Army Air Forces officers
University of Kansas alumni
Iowa State University alumni
Iowa State University faculty
Republican Party members of the Iowa House of Representatives
State treasurers of Iowa
United States Army Air Forces personnel of World War II
Military personnel from Iowa